A remix (or reorchestration) is a piece of media which has been altered or contorted from its original state by adding, removing, or changing pieces of the item. A song, piece of artwork, book, video, poem, or photograph can all be remixes. The only characteristic of a remix is that it appropriates and changes other materials to create something new.

Most commonly, remixes are a subset of audio mixing in music and song recordings. Songs may be remixed for a large variety of reasons:
 to adapt or revise a song for radio or nightclub play
 to create a stereo or surround sound version of a song where none was previously available
 to improve the fidelity of an older song for which the original master has been lost or degraded
 to alter a song to suit a specific music genre or radio format
 to use some of the original song's materials in a new context, allowing the original song to reach a different audience
 to alter a song for artistic purposes
 to provide additional versions of a song for use as bonus tracks or for a B-side, for example, in times when a CD single might carry a total of 4 tracks
 to create a connection between a smaller artist and a more successful one, as was the case with Fatboy Slim's remix of "Brimful of Asha" by Cornershop
 to improve the first or demo mix of the song, generally to ensure a professional product.
 to improve a song from its original state
Remixes should not be confused with edits, which usually involve shortening a final stereo master for marketing or broadcasting purposes. Another distinction should be made between a remix, which recombines audio pieces from a recording to create an altered version of a song, and a cover: a re-recording of someone else's song.

While audio mixing is one of the most popular and recognized forms of remixing, this is not the only media form which is remixed in numerous examples. Literature, film, technology, and social systems can all be argued as a form of remix.

Roots of the remixing of sounds 

Since the beginnings of recorded sound in the late 19th century, technology has enabled people to rearrange the normal listening experience.  With the advent of easily editable magnetic tape in the 1940s and 1950s and the subsequent development of multitrack recording, such alterations became more common.  In those decades the experimental genre of musique concrète used tape manipulation to create sound compositions. Less artistically lofty edits produced medleys or novelty recordings of various types.

Modern remixing had its roots in the dance hall culture of late-1960s/early-1970s Jamaica. The fluid evolution of music that encompassed ska, rocksteady, reggae and dub was embraced by local music mixers who deconstructed and rebuilt tracks to suit the tastes of their audience. Producers and engineers like Ruddy Redwood, King Tubby and Lee "Scratch" Perry popularized stripped-down instrumental mixes (which they called "versions") of reggae tunes. At first, they simply dropped the vocal tracks, but soon more sophisticated effects were created, dropping separate instrumental tracks in and out of the mix, isolating and repeating hooks, and adding various effects like echo, reverberation and delay.  The German krautrock band Neu! also used other effects on side two of their album Neu! 2 by manipulating their previously released single Super/Neuschnee multiple ways, utilizing playback at different turntable speeds or mangling by using a cassette recorder.

From the mid-1970s, DJs in early discothèques were performing similar tricks with disco songs (using loops and tape edits) to get dancers on the floor and keep them there. One noteworthy figure was Tom Moulton who invented the dance remix as we now know it.  Though not a DJ (a popular misconception), Moulton had begun his career by making a homemade mix tape for a Fire Island dance club in the late 1960s.  His tapes eventually became popular and he came to the attention of the music industry in New York City.  At first, Moulton was simply called upon to improve the aesthetics of dance-oriented recordings before release ("I didn't do the remix, I did the mix"—Tom Moulton).  Eventually, he moved from being a "fix it" man on pop records to specializing in remixes for the dance floor.  Along the way, he invented the breakdown section and the 12-inch single vinyl format. Walter Gibbons provided the dance version of the first commercial 12-inch single ("Ten Percent", by Double Exposure). Contrary to popular belief, Gibbons did not mix the record. In fact his version was a re-edit of the original mix.  Moulton, Gibbons and their contemporaries (Jim Burgess, Tee Scott, and later Larry Levan and Shep Pettibone) at Salsoul Records proved to be the most influential group of remixers for the disco era.  The Salsoul catalog is seen (especially in the UK and Europe) as being the "canon" for the disco mixer's art form. Pettibone is among a very small number of remixers whose work successfully transitioned from the disco to the House era. (He is certainly the most high-profile remixer to do so.) His contemporaries included Arthur Baker and François Kevorkian.

Contemporaneously to disco in the mid-1970s, the dub and disco remix cultures met through Jamaican immigrants to the Bronx, energizing both and helping to create hip-hop music. Key figures included DJ Kool Herc and Grandmaster Flash.  Cutting (alternating between duplicate copies of the same record) and scratching (manually moving the vinyl record beneath the turntable needle) became part of the culture, creating what Slate magazine called "real-time, live-action collage."  One of the first mainstream successes of this style of remix was the 1983 track Rockit by Herbie Hancock, as remixed by Grand Mixer D.ST. Malcolm McLaren and the creative team behind ZTT Records would feature the "cut up" style of hip hop on such records as "Duck Rock". English duo Coldcut's remix of Eric B. & Rakim's "Paid in Full" Released in October 1987 is said to have "laid the groundwork for hip hop's entry into the UK mainstream". Dorian Lynskey of The Guardian named it a "benchmark remix" and placed it in his top ten list of remixes. The Coldcut remix "Seven Minutes of Madness" became one of the first commercially successful remixes, becoming a top fifteen hit in countries such as Germany, the Netherlands and the United Kingdom.

History

Early pop remixes were fairly simple; in the 1980s, "extended mixes" of songs were released to clubs and commercial outlets on vinyl 12-inch singles. These typically had a duration of six to seven minutes, and often consisted of the original song with 8 or 16 bars of instruments inserted, often after the second chorus; some were as simplistic as two copies of the song stitched end to end.  As the cost and availability of new technologies allowed, many of the bands who were involved in their own production (such as Yellow Magic Orchestra, Depeche Mode, New Order, Erasure, and Duran Duran) experimented with more intricate versions of the extended mix. Madonna began her career writing music for dance clubs and used remixes extensively to propel her career; one of her early boyfriends was noted DJ John Jellybean Benitez, who created several mixes of her work.

Art of Noise took the remix styles to an extreme—creating music entirely of samples.  They were among the first popular groups to truly harness the potential that had been unleashed by the synthesizer-based compositions of electronic musicians such as Kraftwerk, Yellow Magic Orchestra, Giorgio Moroder, and Jean Michel Jarre.  Contemporaneous to Art of Noise was the seminal body of work by Yello (composed, arranged and mixed by Boris Blank).  Primarily because they featured sampled and synthesized sounds, Yello and Art of Noise would produce a great deal of influential work for the next phase.  Others such as Cabaret Voltaire and the aforementioned Jarre (whose Zoolook was an epic usage of sampling and sequencing) were equally influential in this era.

After the rise of dance music in the late 1980s, a new form of remix was popularised, where the vocals would be kept and the instruments would be replaced, often with matching backing in the house music idiom. Jesse Saunders, known as The Originator of House Music, was the first producer to change the art of remixing by creating his own original music, entirely replacing the earlier track, then mixing back in the artist's original lyrics to make his remix. He introduced this technique for the first time with the Club Nouveau song "It's a Cold, Cold World", in May 1988.  Another clear example of this approach is Roberta Flack's 1989 ballad "Uh-Uh Ooh-Ooh Look Out (Here It Comes)", which Chicago House great Steve "Silk" Hurley dramatically reworked into a boisterous floor-filler by stripping away all the instrumental tracks and substituting a minimalist, sequenced "track" to underpin her vocal delivery, remixed for the UK release which reached No1 pop by Simon Harris.  The art of the remix gradually evolved, and soon more avant-garde artists such as Aphex Twin were creating more experimental remixes of songs (relying on the groundwork of Cabaret Voltaire and the others), which varied radically from their original sound and were not guided by pragmatic considerations such as sales or "danceability", but were created for "art's sake".

In the 1990s, with the rise of powerful home computers with audio capabilities came the mash-up, an unsolicited, unofficial (and often legally dubious) remix created by "underground remixers" who edit two or more recordings (often of wildly different songs) together. Girl Talk is perhaps the most famous of this movement, creating albums using sounds entirely from other music and cutting it into his own.  Underground mixing is more difficult than the typical official remix because clean copies of separated tracks such as vocals or individual instruments are usually not available to the public. Some artists (such as Björk, Nine Inch Nails, and Public Enemy) embraced this trend and outspokenly sanctioned fan remixing of their work; there was once a web site which hosted hundreds of unofficial remixes of Björk's songs, all made using only various officially sanctioned mixes. Other artists, such as Erasure, have included remix software in their officially released singles, enabling almost infinite permutations of remixes by users. The band has also presided over remix competitions for their releases, selecting their favourite fan-created remix to appear on later official releases.

Remixing has become prevalent in heavily synthesized electronic and experimental music circles. Many of the people who create cutting-edge music in such genres as synthpop and aggrotech are solo artists or pairs. They will often use remixers to help them with skills or equipment that they do not have. Artists such as Chicago-based Delobbo, Dallas-based LehtMoJoe, and Russian DJ Ram, who has worked with t.A.T.u., are sought out for their remixing skill and have impressive lists of contributions. It is not uncommon for industrial bands to release albums that have remixes as half of the songs. Indeed, there have been popular singles that have been expanded to an entire album of remixes by other well-known artists.

Some industrial groups allow, and often encourage, their fans to remix their music, notably Nine Inch Nails, whose website contains a list of downloadable songs that can be remixed using Apple's GarageBand software.  Some artists have started releasing their songs in the U-MYX format, which allows buyers to mix songs and share them on the U-MYX website.

Some radio stations, such as the UK's  make extensive use of Remixes in their formats to create a hotter, more up-beat sound than their market rivals.

In popular music

Recent technology allows for easier remixing, leading to a rise in its use in the music industry. It can be done legally, but there have been numerous disputes over rights to samples used in remixed songs. Many famous artists have been involved in remix disputes. In 2015, Jay-Z went to trial over a dispute about his use of a sample from "Khosara Khosara", a composition by Egyptian composer Baligh Hamdy in his song "Big Pimpin'". Osama Fahmy, a nephew of Hamdy, argued that while Jay-Z had the “economic rights” to use the song, he did not have the “moral rights”.

In 1988, Sinéad O'Connor's art-rock song "I Want Your (Hands On Me)" was remixed to emphasize the urban appeal of the composition (the original contains a tight, grinding bassline and a rhythm guitar not entirely unlike Chic's work). In 1989, the Cure's "Pictures of You" was remixed turning "the music on its head, twisted the beat completely, but at the same time left the essential heart of the song intact."	

Remixes have become the norm in contemporary dance music, giving one song the ability to appeal across many different musical genres or dance venues. Such remixes often include "featured" artists, adding new vocalists or musicians to the original mix. The remix is also widely used in hip hop and rap music. An R&B remix usually has the same music as the original song but has added or altered verses that are rapped or sung by the featured artists. It usually contains some if not all of the original verses of the song however they may be arranged in a different order than they originally were.

In the early 1990s, Mariah Carey became one of the first mainstream artists who re-recorded vocals for a dancefloor version, and by 1993 most of her major dance and urban-targeted versions had been re-sung, e.g. "Dreamlover". Some artists would contribute new or additional vocals for the different versions of their songs. These versions were not technically remixes, as entirely new productions of the material were undertaken (the songs were "re-cut", usually from the ground up).  Carey worked with producer Puff Daddy to create the official Bad Boy remix of "Fantasy". The Bad Boy remix features background vocals by Puff Daddy and rapping by Ol' Dirty Bastard, the latter being of concern to Columbia who feared the sudden change in style would affect sales negatively. Some of the song's R&B elements were removed for the remix, while the bassline and "Genius of Love" sample were emphasized and the bridge from the original version was used as the chorus. There is a version omitting Ol' Dirty Bastard's verses. The "Bad Boy Fantasy Remix", combines the chorus from the original version and the chorus of the Bad Boy Remix together, removing Ol' Dirty Bastard's vocals from his second verse. Carey re-recorded vocals for club remixes of the song by David Morales, titled "Daydream Interlude (Fantasy Sweet Dub Mix)".

The Bad Boy remix garnered positive reviews from music critics. "Fantasy" exemplified how a music sample could be transformed "into a fully realized pop masterpiece". The song and its remix arguably remains as one of Carey's most important singles to date. Due to the song's commercial success, Carey helped popularize rapper as a featured act through her post-1995 songs. Sasha Frere-Jones, editor of The New Yorker commented in referencing to the song's remix: "It became standard for R&B/hip-hop stars like Missy Elliott and Beyoncé, to combine melodies with rapped verses. And young white pop stars—including Britney Spears, 'N Sync, and Christina Aguilera—have spent much of the past ten years making pop music that is unmistakably R&B." Moreover, Jones concludes that "Her idea of pairing a female songbird with the leading male MCs of hip-hop changed R&B and, eventually, all of pop. Although now anyone is free to use this idea, the success of "Mimi" [ref. to The Emancipation of Mimi, her tenth studio album released almost a decade after "Fantasy"] suggests that it still belongs to Carey." John Norris of MTV News has stated that the remix was "responsible for, I would argue, an entire wave of music that we've seen since and that is the R&B-hip-hop collaboration. You could argue that the 'Fantasy' remix was the single most important recording that she's ever made." Norris echoed the sentiments of TLC's Lisa Lopes, who told MTV that it's because of Mariah that we have "hip-pop." Judnick Mayard, writer of TheFader, wrote that in regarding of R&B and hip hop collaboration, "The champion of this movement is Mariah Carey." Mayard also expressed that "To this day ODB and Mariah may still be the best and most random hip hop collaboration of all time", citing that due to the record "Fantasy", "R&B and Hip Hop were the best of step siblings." In the 1998 film Rush Hour, Soo Yong is singing the song while it plays on the car radio, shortly before her kidnapping. In 2011, the experimental metal band Iwrestledabearonce used the song at the beginning and end of the video "You Know That Ain't Them Dogs' Real Voices".
Indie artist Grimes has called "Fantasy" one of her favorite songs of all-time and has said Mariah is the reason there is a Grimes.

M.C. Lyte was asked to provide a "guest rap", and a new tradition was born in pop music.  George Michael would feature three artistically differentiated arrangements of "I Want Your Sex" in 1987, highlighting the potential of "serial productions" of a piece to find markets and expand the tastes of listeners. In 1995, after doing "California Love", which proved to be his best selling single ever, Tupac Shakur would do its remix with Dr. Dre again featured, who originally wanted it for his next album, but relented to let it be on the album All Eyez on Me instead. This also included the reappearance of Roger Troutman, also from the original, but he ended the remix with an ad-lib on the outro. Mariah Carey's song "Heartbreaker" was remixed, containing lyrical interpolations and an instrumental sample from "Ain't No Fun (If the Homies Can't Have None)" by Snoop Dogg. A separate music video was filmed for the remix, shot in black and white and featuring a cameo appearance by Snoop. In 2001, Jessica Simpson released an urban remix of her song "Irresistible", featuring rappers Lil' Bow Wow and Jermaine Dupri, who also produced the track. It samples the Kool & the Gang's song "Jungle Boogie" (1973) and "Why You Treat Me So Bad" by Club Nouveau (1987).

Released on July 12, 1999, "Always You" remix by Jennifer Paige, reached number six on the Billboard Dance/Club Play chart.

The main single of I Turn to You by Melanie C, was released as the "Hex Hector Radio Mix", for which Hex Hector won the 2001 Grammy as Remixer of the Year.

Another well-known example is R. Kelly, who recorded two different versions of "Ignition" for his 2003 album Chocolate Factory.  The song is unique in that it segues from the end of the original to the beginning of the remixed version (accompanied by the line "Now usually I don't do this, but uh, go ahead on, break em' off with a little preview of the remix."). In addition, the original version's beginning line "You remind me of something/I just can't think of what it is" is actually sampled from an older Kelly song, "You Remind Me of Something". Kelly later revealed that he actually wrote "Ignition (remix)" before the purported original version of "Ignition", and created the purported original so that the chorus lyric in his alleged remix would make sense.  Madonna's I'm Breathless featured a remix of "Now I'm Following You" that was used to segue from the original to "Vogue" so that the latter could be added to the set without jarring the listener.

In 2015, EDM artist Deadmau5, who worked with Jay-Z's Roc Nation, tried to sue his former manager for remixing his songs without permission, claiming that he gave his manager the go-ahead to use his work for some remixes, but not others. Deadmau5 wanted reimbursement for the remixes his manager made after they had severed ties, because he claimed it was his “moral right” to turn these future remixing opportunities away if he had wanted to. The two parties reached an agreement in 2016 that kept Play Records from making any new remixes. 
	
50 Cent tried to sue rapper Rick Ross in October 2018 for remixing his "In da Club" beat, due to their publicized feud. However, a judge threw out the lawsuit claiming that 50 Cent did not have copyright on the beat, but rather it belonged to Shady/Aftermath Records.

Many hip-hop remixes arose either from the need for a pop/R&B singer to add more of an urban, rap edge to one of their slower songs, or from a rapper's desire to gain more pop appeal by collaborating with an R&B singer.  Remixes can boost popularity of the original versions of songs.

Thanks to a combination of guest raps, re-sung or altered lyrics and alternative backing tracks, some hip-hop remixes can end up being almost entirely different songs from the originals. An example is the remix of "Ain't It Funny" by Jennifer Lopez, which has little in common with the original recording apart from the title.

Slow ballads and R&B songs can be remixed by techno producers and DJs in order to give the song appeal to the club scene and to urban radio.  Conversely, a more uptempo number can be mellowed to give it "quiet storm" appeal.  Frankie Knuckles saddled both markets with his Def Classic Mixes, often slowing the tempo slightly as he removed ornamental elements to soften the "attack" of a dancefloor filler.  These remixes proved hugely influential, notably Lisa Stansfield's classic single "Change" would be aired by urban radio in the Knuckles version, which had been provided as an alternative to the original mix by Ian Devaney and Andy Morris, the record's producers.
In the age of social media, anybody can make and upload a remix. The most popular apps for doing this are Instagram and YouTube.

Broader context

A remix may also refer to a non-linear re-interpretation of a given work or media other than audio such as a hybridizing process combining fragments of various works.  The process of combining and re-contextualizing will often produce unique results independent of the intentions and vision of the original designer/artist.  Thus the concept of a remix can be applied to visual or video arts, and even things farther afield. Mark Z. Danielewski's disjointed novel House of Leaves has been compared by some to the remix concept.

In literature

A remix in literature is an alternative version of a text. William Burroughs used the cut-up technique developed by Brion Gysin to remix language in the 1960s. Various textual sources (including his own) would be cut literally into pieces with scissors, rearranged on a page, and pasted to form new sentences, new ideas, new stories, and new ways of thinking about words.

"The Soft Machine" (1961) is a famous example of an early novel by Burroughs based on the cut-up technique. Remixing of literature and language is also apparent in Pixel Juice (2000) by Jeff Noon who later explained using different methods for this process with Cobralingus (2001).

In art

A remix in art often takes multiple perspectives upon the same theme. An artist takes an original work of art and adds their own take on the piece creating something completely different while still leaving traces of the original work. It is essentially a reworked abstraction of the original work while still holding remnants of the original piece while still letting the true meanings of the original piece shine through. Famous examples include The Marilyn Diptych by Andy Warhol (modifies colors and styles of one image), and The Weeping Woman by Pablo Picasso, (merges various angles of perspective into one view). Some of Picasso's other famous paintings also incorporate parts of his life, such as his love affairs, into his paintings.  For example, his painting Les Trois Danseuses, or The Three Dancers, is about a love triangle.

Other types of remixes in art are parodies. A parody in contemporary usage, is a work created to mock, comment on, or make fun at an original work, its subject, author, style, or some other target, by means of humorous, satiric or ironic imitation. They can be found all throughout art and culture from literature to animation. Famous song parody artists include "Weird Al" Yankovic and Allan Sherman. Several current television shows are filled with parodies, such as South Park, Family Guy, and The Simpsons.

The internet has allowed for art to be remixed quite easily, as evidenced by sites like memgenerator.net (provides pictorial template upon which any words may be written by various anonymous users), and Dan Walsh's Garfieldminusgarfield.net(removes the main character from various original strips by Garfield creator Jim Davis).

"A feminist remix is a creative resistance and cultural production that talks back to patriarchy by reworking patriarchal hierarchical systems privileging men.
Examples include Barbara Kruger's You are not yourself (1982), We are not what we seem (1988), and Your body is a battleground (1989)
Barbara Kruger, Orlan's (1994) Self-Hybridizations Orlan, Evelin Stermitz's remix, Women at War (2010), and Distaff [Ain’t I Redux] (2008) by artist Sian Amoy.

In media and consumer products

In recent years the concept of the remix has been applied analogously to other media and products. In 2001, the British Channel 4 television program Jaaaaam was produced as a remix of the sketches from the comedy show Jam. In 2003 The Coca-Cola Company released a new version of their soft drink Sprite with tropical flavors under the name Sprite Remix.

In 1995, Sega released Virtua Fighter Remix (バーチャファイター　リミックス/Bāchafaitā rimikkusu) as an update to, just months after the Virtua Fighter release on the Sega Saturn.

Virtua Fighter had been released on the Saturn in a less-than-impressive state. Sega had attempted to make an accurate port of the Sega Model 1 arcade version, and therefore chose to use untextured models and the soundtrack from the arcade machine. However, as the Saturn was incapable of rendering as many polygons on screen as Model 1 hardware, characters looked noticeably worse. Many claim it to be even worse than the Sega 32X version, thanks to the added CD loading time.

Virtua Fighter Remix was created to address many of these flaws. Models have a slightly higher polygon count (though still less than the Model 1 version); they are also texture-mapped, leading to a much more modern-looking game that could effectively compete with the PlayStation. The game also allows players to use the original flat-shaded models.

In the west, a CG Portrait Collection Disc was also included in the Saturn bundle. North American owners would get Virtua Fighter Remix for free if they registered their Saturns, while Japanese customers would later receive a SegaNet compatible version. Sega would also bring Virtua Fighter Remix to Sega Titan Video arcade hardware.

Copyright implications

Because remixes may borrow heavily from an existing piece of music (possibly more than one), the issue of intellectual property becomes a concern. The most important question is whether a remixer is free to redistribute his or her work, or whether the remix falls under the category of a derivative work according to, for example, United States copyright law. Of note are open questions concerning the legality of visual works, like the art form of collage, which can be plagued with licensing issues.

There are two obvious extremes with regard to derivative works. If the song is substantively dissimilar in form (for example, it might only borrow a motif which is modified, and be completely different in all other respects), then it may not necessarily be a derivative work (depending on how heavily modified the melody and chord progressions were). On the other hand, if the remixer only changes a few things (for example, the instrument and tempo), then it is clearly a derivative work and subject to the copyrights of the original work's copyright holder.

The Creative Commons is a non-profit organization that allows the sharing and use of creativity and knowledge through free legal tools and explicitly aims for enabling a Remix culture. They created a website that allows artists to share their work with other users, giving them the ability to share, use, or build upon their work, under the Creative Commons license. The artist can limit the copyright to specific users for specific purposes, while protecting the users and the artist.

The exclusive rights of the copyright owner over acts such as reproduction/copying, communication, adaptation and performance – unless licensed openly – by their very nature reduce the ability to negotiate copyright material without permission.
Remixes will inevitably encounter legal problems when the whole or a substantial part of the original material has been reproduced, copied, communicated, adapted or performed – unless a permission has been given in advance through a voluntary open content license like a Creative Commons license, there is fair dealing involved (the scope of which is extraordinarily narrow), a statutory license exists, or permission has been sought and obtained from the copyright owner. Generally, the courts consider what will amount to a substantial part by reference to its quality, as opposed to quantity and the importance the part taken bears in relation to the work as whole.

There are proposed theories of reform regarding the copyright law and remixes. Nicolas Suzor believes that copyright law should be reformed in such a manner as to allow certain reuses of copyright material without the permission of the copyright owner where those derivatives are highly transformative and do not impact upon the primary market of the copyright owner. There certainly appears to be a strong argument that non commercial derivatives, which do not compete with the market for the original material, should be afforded some defense to copyright actions.

Stanford Law professor Lawrence Lessig believes that for the first time in history creativity by default is subject to regulation because of two architectural features. First, cultural objects or products created digitally can be easily copied, and secondly, the default copyright law requires the permission of the owner. The result is that one needs the permission of the copyright owner to engage in mashups or acts of remixing. Lessig believes that the key to mashups and remix is "education – not about framing or law – but rather what you can do with technology, and then the law will catch up". 
He believes that trade associations – like mashup guilds – that survey practices and publish reports to establish norm or reasonable behaviours in the context of the community would be useful in establishing fair use parameters. Lessig also 
believes that Creative Commons and other licences, such as the GNU General Public Licence are important mechanisms which mashup and remix artists can use to mitigate the impact of copyright law. Lessig laid out his ideas in a book called "Remix" which is itself free to remix under a CC BY-NC license.

The Fair Use agreement allows users to use copyrighted materials without asking the permission of the original creator (section 107 of the federal copyright law). Within this agreement, the copyrighted material that is borrowed must be used under specific government regulations. Material borrowed falls under fair use depending on the amount of original content used, the nature of the content, the purpose of the borrowed content, and the effect the borrowed content has on an audience. Unfortunately, there are no distinct lines between copyright infringement and abiding by fair use regulations while producing a remix.  However, if the work that is distributed by the remixer is an entirely new and transformative work that is not for profit, copyright laws are not breached.  The key word in such considerations is transformative, as the remix product must have been either sufficiently altered or clearly used for a sufficiently different purpose for it to be safe from copyright violation.

In 2012, Canada's Copyright Modernization Act explicitly added a new exemption which allows non-commercial remixing.
In 2013, the US court ruling Lenz v. Universal Music Corp. acknowledged that amateur remixing might fall under fair use and copyright holders are requested to check and respect fair use before doing DMCA take down notices.

In June 2015, a WIPO article named "Remix Culture and Amateur Creativity: A Copyright Dilemma" acknowledged the "age of remixing" and the need for a copyright reform.

See also

 Assemblage
 Audio mixing
 :Category:Remixers
 Ccmixter
 Cover version
 Electronic dance music
 Mashup (education)
 Multitracking
 Musical montage
 Plunderphonics
 Rave
 Sound collage
 Web literacy (Remixing)

References

External links
 

 
Musical techniques